José Eduardo de Cárdenas (1765–1821) was a priest, theologist, politician, poet and writer of New Spain (now Mexico).

Mexican male poets
People from Tabasco
18th-century Mexican Roman Catholic priests
Mexican academics
1765 births
1821 deaths
18th-century Mexican writers
18th-century Mexican poets
19th-century Mexican poets
19th-century male writers
19th-century Mexican Roman Catholic priests
18th-century male writers